Kaohsiung County was a county in southern Taiwan between 1945 and 2010. The county seat was located in Fongshan City.

History
Kaohsiung County was established on 6 December 1945 on the territory of Takao Prefecture shortly after the end of World War II. In the early years, Kaohsiung County consists of most territory of Takao Prefecture except the territory near cities of Takao (Kaohsiung) and Heitō (Pingtung). The county is divided into districts, which come from reformed Japanese districts. The districts are divided into townships.

On 16 August 1950, another division reform was implemented. The southern part of the county was separated and established Pingtung County. The remaining Kaohsiung County has territory equivalent to the Hōzan (Fengshan), Okayama (Kangshan), and Kizan (Chishan) in the Japanese era. In addition, districts in the remaining part of Kaohsiung County was defunct. All townships were directly controlled by the County Government. On 25 December 2010, the county merged with Kaohsiung City to form a larger single special municipality.

Administration 
The subdivisions of the County remains mostly stable between 1950 and 2010. However, some changed has also been made.
 1 Jul 1957, Maya Township was renamed Sanmin Township, Yani Township was renamed Taoyuan Township, Tona Township was renamed Maolin Township.
 1 Jul 1972, Fengshan reformed from an urban township to a county-administered city for its population.
 1 Jul 1979, Hsiaokang merged into Kaohsiung City and reformed from a rural township to a district.
 1 Jan 2008, Sanmin Township was renamed Namasia Township.
In 25 Dec 2010, The county was merged with Kaohsiung City, all cities and townships became districts. On the eve of merging with Kaohsiung City, the county consists of the following administrative divisions

See also
 Kaohsiung
 List of county magistrates of Kaohsiung

References

External links 

 Kaohsiung County Government Official Website in English

1945 establishments in Taiwan
2010 disestablishments in Taiwan
History of Kaohsiung
Former counties of Taiwan